Sennampatti is a village in the Thanjavur taluk of Thanjavur district, Tamil Nadu, India.

Demographics
As per the 2001 census, Sennampatti had a total population of 1319 with 630 males and 689 females. The sex ratio was 1094. The literacy rate was 51.25.

The panchayat president is p.rajinikanth.

References
 

Villages in Thanjavur district